Llyn Padarn is a glacially formed lake in Snowdonia, Gwynedd, north Wales, and is an example of a moraine dammed lake. At its south-eastern end it is linked to the neighbouring Llyn Peris (which forms the lower reservoir of the Dinorwig power station). The busy village of Llanberis lies on the southern banks of the lake.

Most of Llyn Padarn is owned by Gwynedd Council and is part of Padarn Country Park. Whilst kayaking, rowing and sailing are permitted on the lake, powered craft require permission to use it. Bangor University Rowing Club row at Llyn Padarn.

In April 2014 Llyn Padarn was designated as Bathing Water under the Bathing Water Directive (2006/7/EC).

The outflow of Llyn Padarn is on the northern shore and is called Afon Rhythallt, which passes by the village of Brynrefail, Gwynedd and becomes Afon Seiont below Pont Rhythallt, near Llanrug. It reaches the sea at Caernarfon.

Padarn Country Park is located on the northern flank of the lake, including Coed Allt Wen, a rare and ancient sessile oak woodland. Both the woodland and Llyn Padarn are designated as Sites of Special Scientific Interest.

The Llanberis Lake Railway also runs along its eastern bank and various recreational activities take place on the lake, especially during the summer. These include canoeing, boating and fishing. The lake was the venue for the rowing events of the 1958 British Empire and Commonwealth Games.

Former local bus company Padarn Bus, which operated between 1979 and 2014 from a base at nearby Llanberis, was named after the lake.

Llyn Padarn is named after Padarn, an early 6th century saint, who has a church dedicated to him in Llanberis.

1993 RAF Helicopter Crash
In 1993, an RAF Westland Wessex helicopter suffered a rotor failure, and crashed into the lake, killing three Air Training Corps Cadets, Christopher Bailey (15) from Horwich, Mark Oakden (16) and Amanda Whitehead (17) from Bury, and injuring one.

References

External links 

www.geograph.co.uk : photos of Llyn Padarn and surrounding area

Llanberis
Llanddeiniolen
Padarn
Tourism in Gwynedd
Sites of Special Scientific Interest in West Gwynedd